Sir Hugh Edward Adair, 3rd Baronet (26 December 1815 – 2 March 1902) was a British Liberal Party politician who served from 1847 to 1874 as a Member of Parliament (MP) for Ipswich in Suffolk.

Biography
Adair was the second son of Sir Robert Shafto Adair, 1st baronet, and his first wife Elizabeth Maria Strode. He was educated at Harrow, and at St John's College, Oxford.

Adair was elected at the 1847 general election as one of the two MPs for Ipswich, and held the seat until he stood down from the House of Commons at the 1874 general election.

He succeeded to the baronetcy in February 1886, on the death of his elder brother Robert.

He died at Tunbridge Wells on 2 March 1902, aged 86.

Family
Adair married Harriet Camilla Adair, daughter of Alexander Adair, on 10 July 1856. They had three sons, the eldest of whom lived for only ten years.

On his death, his second son Frederick succeeded to the baronetcy, and after Frederick's death in 1915 the title was inherited by Hugh's third son, Robert.

References

External links 
 

1815 births
1902 deaths
People educated at Harrow School
Alumni of St John's College, Oxford
Liberal Party (UK) MPs for English constituencies
Members of the Parliament of the United Kingdom for Ipswich
UK MPs 1847–1852
UK MPs 1852–1857
UK MPs 1857–1859
UK MPs 1859–1865
UK MPs 1865–1868
UK MPs 1868–1874
Baronets in the Baronetage of the United Kingdom